Sylvia Bataille (born Sylvia Maklès; 1 November 1908 – 22 December 1993) was a French actress of Romanian-Jewish descent. When she was twenty, she married the writer Georges Bataille with whom she had a daughter, the psychoanalyst Laurence Bataille (1930–1986). Georges Bataille and Sylvia separated in 1934 but did not divorce until 1946. Starting in 1938, she was a companion of the psychoanalyst Jacques Lacan with whom, in 1941, she had a daughter, Judith (married name Judith Miller). Sylvia Bataille married Jacques Lacan in 1953.

A pupil of Charles Dullin, Bataille's theatrical debut was with the agit-prop troupe Groupe Octobre, directed by Jacques Prévert. Her film debut came in 1933, and in 1936 she played her most memorable role in Partie de campagne (A Day in the Country) directed by Jean Renoir. Her final appearance was in 1950.

Filmography
 1930: The Tale of the Fox animated, feature film by Ladislas Starevitch, voice of Rabbit
 1930: La Joie d'une heure, short film by André Cerf
 1933: The Faceless Voice by Léo Mittler
 1934: Por un perro chico, una mujer (Un chien qui raccroche), short film by Santiago de la Concha - Santiago Ontañón
 1934: Adémaï aviateur by Jean Tarride
 1935: Son excellence Antonin by Charles-Félix Tavano
 1936: Topaze by Marcel Pagnol
 1936: Rose by Raymond Rouleau
 1936: Partie de campagne by Jean Renoir
 1936: Œil de lynx, détective by Pierre-Jean Ducis
 1936: The Crime of Monsieur Lange by Jean Renoir
 1936: Jenny by Marcel Carné
 1937: Vous n'avez rien à déclarer? by Léo Joannon
 1937: Le Gagnant (short film) by Yves Allégret
 1937: The Courier of Lyon by Maurice Lehmann and Claude Autant-Lara
 1937: Forfaiture (released as The Cheat in English) by Marcel L'Herbier
 1937: White Cargo by Robert Siodmak
 1938: Frères corses by Géo Kelber
 1938: People Who Travel (Les Gens du voyage in French) by Jacques Feyder
 1939: Le Château des quatre obèses by Yvan Noé
 1939: Serge Panine by Charles Méré
 1939: L'Étrange nuit de Noël by Yvan Noé
 1939: Latin Quarter by Pierre Colombier
 1940: Hangman's Noose by Léon Mathot
 1940: Camp Thirteen by Jacques Constant
 1941: L'Enfer des anges by Christian-Jaque
 1945: Ils étaient cinq permissionnaires by Pierre Caron
 1946: Gates of the Night by Marcel Carné
 1948: Ulysse ou Les Mauvaises Rencontres, short film (also known as Aller et retour) by Alexandre Astruc
 1948: L'Amore, anthology film by Roberto Rossellini
 1950: Julie de Carneilhan by Jacques Manuel

Notes

References

Bibliography

External links

French film actresses
Actresses from Paris
French people of Romanian-Jewish descent
Jewish French actresses
1908 births
1993 deaths
20th-century French actresses